Tina Liebling (born 1953) is a Minnesota attorney and politician who is a member of the Minnesota House of Representatives. A member of the Minnesota Democratic–Farmer–Labor Party (DFL), she represents District 26A, which consists almost entirely of the city of Rochester in Olmsted County, in southeastern Minnesota. She was a candidate for the Governor of Minnesota in 2018, but withdrew from the race in mid-March.

Early life and education
Liebling was born and raised in Minneapolis, Minnesota, the daughter of noted photographer Jerome Liebling. After her family moved away from the area, she returned to attend the University of Minnesota, earning a B.A. in Spanish and graduating magna cum laude. She went on to attend the University of Massachusetts-Amherst, receiving an M.S. in Public Health, then went to Boston University School of Law, graduating cum laude with a J.D.

Political career
Liebling's political career began in 2002, when she first ran for the District 30A seat, finishing second behind former state representative Carla Nelson in a three-way race. She ran again in 2004, defeating Nelson with 50.75% of the vote. She and Andy Welti, a former DFL representative from neighboring District 30B, were part of large DFL gains in the Minnesota House in 2004. The two were the first Democrats to represent the Rochester area, a traditionally Republican stronghold, in many years. She was sworn in on January 4, 2005.

Liebling was re-elected in 2006 with 52.76% of the vote, again defeating Carla Nelson. In the 2008 election, she faced Rochester businessman Jacob Dettinger, defeating him with 61.81% of the vote. In the 2010 election, she defeated Charlie O'Connell, garnering 55.15% of the vote to O'Connell's 44.73%. In 2012, running in a slightly altered district due to redistricting, she defeated Breanna Bly, a Rochester School Board member, 58.8% to 41.0%. She again defeated Breanna Bly in the 2014 election, winning 55.2% to 44.7%. In 2016, she defeated political novice Will Waggoner 59.9% to 40.0%. In 2018, she had her largest percentage of votes ever, winning over former Olmsted County Commissioner Paul Wilson 63.2% to 36.6%.

She served as an assistant majority leader during the 2007-08 session, but declined to serve again in that position for the 2009-10 biennium. She became the DFL lead on the Health and Human Services (HHS) Reform Committee for the 2011-12 biennium and also served on the Health and Human Service Finance and Judiciary Policy and Finance Committees. When the DFL retook the majority after the 2012 election, she became chair of the Health and Human Services Policy Committee for the 2013-14 biennium. She also served on the Health and Human Services Finance Committee, the Civil Law Committee, and the Taxes Committee. When the Republicans became the majority after the 2014 election, she was the DFL health care lead on the HHS Finance Committee 2015-2017, also serving on the HHS Reform and the Ways and Means Committees, and the DFL lead on the HHS Reform Committee 2017-2018, also serving on the HHS Finance and Ways and Means Committees. Since the DFL took control of the Minnesota House in 2019, she is chair of the Health and Human Services Finance Division, which controls a third of the state’s budget. She also serves on the HHS Policy Committee and the Judiciary Finance and Civil Law Division (A Finance Division or Division is the Minnesota equivalent of an Appropriations Subcommittee in Congress and the Ways and Means Committee is the equivalent of the Appropriations Committee.) 

Liebling supported Senator Bernie Sanders during the 2016 Democratic presidential primaries, breaking with state party leadership. She supported Elizabeth Warren in the 2020 primaries while Warren was running.

Candidate for Governor 2018

On April 2, 2017 Liebling announced her candidacy for Governor of Minnesota, since Governor Mark Dayton was not seeking re-election. She finished fifth in the Minnesota DFL gubernatorial preference poll in February 2018 with about 6% of the vote statewide  and dropped out of the race the next month.

Personal life

She married her husband, Dr. Mark Liebow, shortly after law school, and moved to the Chicago area, where her three children were born. In 1994, she moved to Rochester, where her husband was hired as a consultant for the Mayo Clinic, and she began a solo law practice focused on criminal law.

Election history

References

External links 

 Rep. Tina Liebling official Minnesota House of Representatives website
 Rep. Tina Liebling official campaign website
 Minnesota Public Radio Votetracker: Rep. Tina Liebling
 Project Votesmart: Rep. Tina Liebling Profile
 Tina Liebling on Twitter
 Tina Liebling on Facebook

1953 births
Living people
Politicians from Minneapolis
Democratic Party members of the Minnesota House of Representatives
Politicians from Rochester, Minnesota
University of Minnesota College of Liberal Arts alumni
Boston University School of Law alumni
Women state legislators in Minnesota
American women lawyers
21st-century American politicians
21st-century American women politicians
University of Massachusetts Amherst School of Public Health and Health Sciences alumni